Eubrachion is a genus of flowering plants belonging to the family Santalaceae.

Its native range is Caribbean to Southern Tropical America.

Species:

Eubrachion ambiguum 
Eubrachion gracile

References

Santalaceae
Santalales genera